HTMS Makut Rajakumarn is a frigate operated by the Royal Thai Navy. The ship was built by Yarrow Shipbuilders in Glasgow, Scotland 1971. The ship entered service in 1973 and is currently (2010) in service as a training ship.

The design was based on the Malaysian frigate , but is larger and has a second gun at the stern. The ship was refitted in 1985–1988 following an engine room fire in 1984, with the Sea Cat missiles and Limbo anti submarine mortar removed and replaced by anti-submarine torpedo tubes and new radar and sonar.

References

 Gardiner, Robert and Stephen Chumbley. Conway's All The World's Fighting Ships 1947–1995. Annapolis, Maryland USA: Naval Institute Press, 1995. .

Ships built on the River Clyde
1971 ships
Frigates of the Royal Thai Navy
Training ships